The Conspirators is a 1924 British silent crime film directed by Sinclair Hill and starring Betty Faire, David Hawthorne and Moore Marriott.

Plot summary

Cast
 Betty Faire as Louise Fitzmaurice  
 David Hawthorne as Herbert Wrayson  
 Moore Marriott as Morris / Sydney Barnes  
 Edward O'Neill as Colonel Fitzmaurice  
 Margaret Hope as Mrs. Barnes  
 Winifred Izard as Queen of Rexonia 
 Fred Rains as Benham

Production
The film was made by Britain's leading film company of the era Stoll Pictures at their Cricklewood Studios in London. It was based on the 1907 novel The Avenger by E. Phillips Oppenheim. The film's sets were designed by art director Walter Murton.

References

Bibliography
 Low, Rachael. History of the British Film, 1918-1929. George Allen & Unwin, 1971.

External links
 

1924 films
1924 crime films
British silent feature films
British crime films
Films directed by Sinclair Hill
Films based on British novels
Stoll Pictures films
Films shot at Cricklewood Studios
British black-and-white films
1920s English-language films
1920s British films